The William Wiggins House, also known as the Dr. J. D. Nichols House, is a historic house in Benton, Tennessee, U.S.. It was built in the 1840s for William Wiggins, a justice of the peace. It was one of the few houses in the county built with bricks as opposed to timber at the time. It was owned by Dr. J. D. Nichols from 1905 to 1930. It has been listed on the National Register of Historic Places since December 2, 1993.

References

National Register of Historic Places in Polk County, Tennessee
Houses completed in 1840